The Salem Public Library is a public library at 370 Essex Street in Salem, Massachusetts. The library building was constructed in 1855 for John Bertram, a prominent sea captain, and his family.

On December 1, 1887, the Bertram family wrote a letter stating their intent to donate the Italianate style mansion to the city of Salem for use as a library, and the city accepted the offer. The library opened its doors on July 8, 1889. The library is part of the North of Boston Library Exchange (NOBLE), a consortium of 26 public and academic libraries, and is located within the Chestnut Street Historic District.

References

External links
Salem Public Library official website

Libraries in Essex County, Massachusetts
Public libraries in Massachusetts